Sonnemann is a surname. Notable people with the surname include: 

Emmy Göring (née Sonnemann; 1893–1973), German actress, and the second wife of Hermann Göring
Ernest A. Sonnemann (1858–1927), American politician 
Leopold Sonnemann (1831–1909), German journalist, newspaper publisher, and political party leader